Elio is an Italian male given name.

Origin 

It shares the same meaning as the Italian feminine name , the Romanian masculine name  and the Lithuanian feminine name .

Elio is also believed to originate from the Roman cognomen Aelius (feminine Aelia), which was held by the emperor Hadrian and thus dates back to the 2nd century. The origin is uncertain, perhaps Etruscan or perhaps from the Latin alius, "[an] other". Some sources trace its origin to the Greek  Ἥλιος (Hélios), a connection categorically rejected by others. The patronymic name Eliano is similarly derived from the Roman cognomen.

Elio may also be a hypocorism of other names such as Aurelio or Cornelio. In Italy, the name Elio occurs throughout and is promoted through the worship of saints with the name. There is also a feminine form, Èlia; however, to avoid confusion with the biblical masculine name  (Elijah), it is generally replaced by Elina or Eliana.

Variants 
Masculine: Eleo, Elios
Feminine: Èlia, Elea

Variants in other languages

Name day 
The name day can be celebrated on October 28 in memory of saint Helios, bishop of Lyon, or on July 18 in memory of saint Elio, deacon and bishop of Koper.

People with the given name Elio 

 Elio Aggiano (born 1972), Italian cyclist
 Elio Altramura, Italian art director
 Elio Augusto Di Carlo (1918–1998), Italian ornithologist, historian and physician
 Elio Ballesi (1920–1971), Italian politician
 Elio Bartolini (1922–2006), Italian writer, screenwriter and poet
 Elio Battaglia (born 1933), Italian operatic baritone
 Elio Bavutti (1914–1987), Italian cyclist
 Stefano "Elio" Belisari (born 1961), Italian singer
 Elio Berhanyer (1929–2019), Spanish fashion designer
 Elio Bertocchi (1919–1971), Italian cyclist
 Elio Bianchi (born 1920), Italian footballer
 Elio Calderini (born 1988), Italian footballer
 Elio Capradossi (born 1996), Italian footballer
 Elio Castro (born 1988), Mexican footballer
 Elio Catola (born 1935), Italian athlete
 Elio Chacón (1936–1992), Venezuelan expatriate baseball player
 Elio Ciol (born 1929), Italian photographer and publisher
 Elio Costa (born 1940), Italian politician and magistrate
 Elio Cotena (born 1945), Italian boxer
 Elio Crovetto (1926–2000), Italian actor, comedian and television personality
 Elio Cruz (1931–2019), Gibraltarian playwright
 Elio de Angelis (1958–1986), Italian racing driver 
 Elio De Anna (born 1949), Italian rugby union player and politician
 Elio De Silvestro (born 1993), Italian footballer
 Elio Di Rupo (born 1951), Belgian politician
 Elio Díaz (born 1962), Venezuelan boxer
 Elio Festa (born 1960), Italian cyclist
 Elio Filippo Accrocca (1923–1996), Italian poet, author, and translator
 Elio Fiorucci (1935–2015), Italian fashion designer
 Elio Fox, American poker player
 Elio García-Austt (1919–2005), Uruguayan neuroscientist
 Elio Gaspari (born 1944), Italian-born Brazilian writer and journalist
 Elio Gasperoni (born 1943), Sammarinese sports shooter
 Elio Germano (born 1980), Italian actor
 Elio Gerussi (1935–1988), Italian cyclist
 Elio Gnagnarelli (born 1946), Italian sports shooter
 Elio Guarisco (1954–2020), Italian writer, translator and Tibetan Buddhist scholar and Dzogchen practitioner.
 Elio Gustinetti (born 1955), Italian football manager
 Elio Guzzanti (1920–2014), Italian doctor and politician
 Elio Ibarra (born 1967), Italian boxer
 Elio Juárez (born 1942), Uruguayan cyclist
 Elio Lampridio Cerva (1463–1520), Ragusan poet and humanist
 Elio Leoni Sceti, Italian businessman
 Elio Lo Cascio (born 1948), Italian historian
 Elio Locatelli (1943–2019), Italian speed skater
 Elio M. García Jr. (born 1978), Cuban-American author
 Elio Marchetti (born 1974), Italian racing driver
 Elio Martusciello (born 1959), Italian experimental music composer and performer
 Elio Modigliani (1860–1932), Italian anthropologist and zoologist
 Elio Mora (born 1977), Paraguayan footballer
 Elio Morille (1927–1998), Italian rower
 Elio Morpurgo (1858–1944), Italian politician
 Elio Pace (born 1968), English singer-songwriter and pianist
 Elio Pagliarani (1927–2012), Italian poet and literary critic
 Elio Pandolfi (1926–2021), Italian actor
 Elio Pecoraro (born 1967), Italian footballer
 Elio Perlman, fictional character from the 2007 novel Call Me by Your Name by André Aciman.
 Elio Petri (1929–1982), Italian filmmaker
 Elio Pietrini (1939–2022), Argentine-born Venezuelan actor
 Elio Ragni (1910–1998), Italian athlete
 Elio Rinero (born 1947), Italian footballer
 Elio Roca (1943–2021), Argentine singer
 Elio Rodríguez (born 1962), Uruguayan footballer
 Elio Rojas (born 1982), Dominican Republican boxer
 Elio Romani (1920–1999), Italian chess player
 Elio Sasso Sant (born 1911), Italian canoeist
 Elio Schneeman (1961–1997), American poet
 Elio Sgreccia (1928–2019), Italian bioethicist and cardinal of the Catholic Church.
 Elio Shazivari (born 1985), Albanian footballer
 Elio Steiner (1904–1965), Italian actor
 Elio Toaff (1915–2015), Italian Orthodox Rabbi
 Elio Veltri (born 1938), Italian journalist and politician
 Elio Verde (born 1987), Italian judoka
 Elio Villafranca, Cuban jazz pianist and composer
 Elio Villate (born 1957), Cuban painter
 Elio Vito (born 1960), Italian politician
 Elio Vittorini (1908–1966), Italian writer and novelist
 Elio Zagato (1921–2009), Italian automobile designer, entrepreneur and racing driver.
 Elio Zamuto (born 1941), Italian actor

Bibliography

References

External links 
 
 

Italian masculine given names
Given names of Greek language origin